Oliver Davies may refer to:

 Oliver Davies (harpist), Welsh harpist
 Oliver Davies (theologian) (born 1956), British theologian
 Olly Davies (born 1995), English rugby league player
 Oliver Ford Davies (born 1939), English actor and writer
 Oliver Davies (cricketer) (born 2000), Australian cricketer

See also
Oliver Davis (disambiguation)